The Altai accentor (Prunella himalayana) is a species of bird in the family Prunellidae. It is also known as the rufous-streaked accentor or Himalayan accentor. It breeds in the Altai Mountains of western Mongolia; it winters in the southern Tian Shan and Himalayan ranges.

Taxonomy
The Altai accentor was described by the English zoologist Edward Blyth in 1842 and given the binomial name Accentor himalayanus. The Altai accentor is now placed in the genus Prunella that was introduced by the French ornithologist Louis Vieillot in 1816. The species is monotypic.

This species, along with the alpine accentor, is sometimes separated from the other accentors into the genus Laiscopus.

Gallery

References

External links
 Xeno-canto: audio recordings of the Altai accentor

Altai accentor
Birds of Mongolia
Altai accentor
Taxonomy articles created by Polbot
Altai accentor